The 2022 Football Tasmania season is the ninth season of soccer under the restructured format in Tasmania. The men's competitions consisted of three major divisions across the State.

Men's Competitions

2022 NPL Tasmania

The 2022 National Premier League Tasmania, known as the McDonald's National Premier League for sponsorship reasons, is the ninth season of soccer under the restructured format in Tasmania. The Premier qualifies for the 2022 National Premier Leagues finals series.

2022 Tasmanian Championships

2022 Northern Championship

2022 Southern Championship

Women's Competitions

2022 Women's Super League

The 2022 Women's Super League season, known as the MyState Bank Women's Super League for sponsorship reasons, is the seventh edition of the statewide Tasmanian women's soccer league.

Cup competitions

Awards 
The end of year awards were presented at MyState Bank Arena on 12 September 2022.

National Premier Leagues Tasmania

References

2022 in Australian soccer
Football Federation Tasmania seasons